The following is a sortable table of all songs by The Story So Far:

Studio recordings

See also
 The Story So Far discography

References
 Footnotes
Bonus track on the Japanese edition of Under Soil and Dirt (2011).

 Citations

Story So Far, The